The Bhatner fort is at Hanumangarh in Rajasthan, India, about 419 km northwest of Jaipur along the old Multan-Delhi route and 230 km north-east of Bikaner. The old name of Hanumangarh was Bhatner, which means "fortress of the Bhati". Believed to be 1700 years old, it is considered to be one of the oldest forts of India.

History 
The ancient fort situated on the bank of River Ghaggar was built between 255 AD to 285 AD by the King Bhupat of Bhati Dynasty. There he constructed a safe castle for himself which came to be known as Bhatner. The entire fort is built of bricks, covering an area of 52 bighas. It is in the shape of a parallelogram, with a dozen bastions on each side. Painted Grey Ware (circa 1100-800 BCE) and Rang-Mahal Ware (1st-3rd century CE) have been found in wells situated along the wall.

In the middle of the thirteenth century CE, Sher Suri (or Sher Khan, not to be confused with the much later Sher Shah Suri), a cousin or nephew of Balban (the Sultan of Delhi), was governor in these parts of the country. He is said to have carried out repairs to the forts of Bhatinda and Bhatner. In 1391, Bhatner was wrested by Timur by defeating Bhatti King Rao Doolchand. A mention has been made in "Tuzuk-e-Timuri" (Autobiography of Timur) about this fort and he stated this fort one of the strongest and secured fort of India. During the Timurid invasion of India in 1398, Timur took 10,000 soldiers from his main army of 150,000 which was advancing towards Delhi under his grandson and laid siege to Bhatner fort, he captured the Bhatner fort, sacked the city and destroyed its fortifications. Also Akbar the Great described it in his book "Ain-I-Akbari". Subsequently, the fort appears to have been held by Bhatis, Johiyas and Chayals until 1527 when it was taken by Rao Jet Singh of Bikaner. After that, it came twice under Mughal control as well, in addition to being the possession of the royal families of Chayals and Bikaner. Researchers believe that the famous Second Battle of Tarain fought between Mohammad Ghori and Prithviraj Chauhan is the present Talwara Jheel area of the district. This fort stands in the path of invasion of India from Central Asia and had acted as a strong barricade against the attack of enemies. Finally in the year of 1805, it was captured by Emperor Soorat Singh of Bikaner and remained with it until the formation of Rajasthan. Since the day of victory was Tuesday (known as day of the Hindu God Hanuman), so he named Bhatner as Hanumangarh.

References 

 Archaeological Survey of India

 https://web.archive.org/web/20090505194825/http://hanumangarh.nic.in/places_of_interest.html

Forts in Rajasthan
Hanumangarh district